Neki Aur Badi is a 1949 Indian Hindi-language patriotic drama film directed by Kidar Sharma. The film stars Sharma with Madhubala and Geeta Bali.

Produced by Oriental Pictures with distribution rights owned by Varma Films, the two companies collaborated in 1949 with two films (Thes and  Neki aur Badi) after the success of their previous box-office hit, Suhaag Raat, which was the seventh highest-grossing film of 1948. To create a template for success, the filmmakers not only used the same director, Kidar Sharma, of Suhaag Raat in Neki aur Badi but also used another important member of Suhaag Raat’s ensemble in Neki aur Badi. Filmindia  in its review of Suhaag Raat, referred to the film as "Geeta Bali's Sohag Raat", giving Geeta Bali much credit for its box-office success; Geeta Bali was cast in an important supporting role in  Neki aur Badi by its filmmakers.

Plot 
On a stormy night, a wealthy man (Pesi Patel) drives his wife (Krishna) and their new-born daughter, Soshila, out of the house because he had hoped his wife would deliver a son.  Years later, what happened is revealed to Soshila (Madhubala), now a young woman, by an old servant, Gopi (Uma Dutt), who also informs her that the father now lives with his wicked new wife (Nazira) and her daughter Baby (Geeta Bali).

In hopes to win back her father’s affections, Soshila decides to run away to Bombay, where her father lives.  Stranded, alone and almost without money, one day she meets Nandan (Kidar Sharma), who extends a helping hand to her.  Over time Soshila and Nandan fall in love and decide that they will attempt to reverse the situation with Soshila’s father.
Both Nandan and Soshila get jobs in Soshila’s father’s home where they get to know his wife and daughter, Baby.

As the days go by, Baby gets attracted to Nandan and starts making advances toward him—much to Soshila’s chagrin.  Nadan manages to convince Soshila’s father one day that both Baby and her mother have been bitten by a mad dog and should both be hospitalized. The father agrees, and the rest of the movie follows Soshila’s efforts to get her father to accept her back into their home.

Cast 
The main cast of the film include:
 Madhubala as Soshila
 Geeta Bali as Baby
 Kidar Sharma as Nandan
 Uma Dutt as Gopi
 Pesi Patel as Soshila's father
 Krishna as Soshila’s mother
 Nazira as Baby’s mother

Production 
In 1946, Sharma had given Madhubala her first break in Neel Kamal and thought of her as his "discovery"; he thus expected her not to work with her directors for at least the time he would establish her. However, Madhubala's mercenary father, known his stubbornness, signed newer films as they came, informing neither Madhubala nor Sharma. Therefore, the production of Neki Aur Badi was an attempt by Sharma to keep the actress with him. Sharma also cast in his another "discovery" Geeta Bali in a supporting role, and introduced music composer Roshan through the film.

Soundtrack 
Music was composed by Roshan, while Kidar Sharma wrote the lyrics. Roshan made his debut as a music director with this film.

Reception 
Neki Aur Badi was commercially unsuccessful and received poor notices from critics. Madhubala's biographer Mohan Deep has said that the film's disastrous results "show how foolish Kidar Sharma could be."

References

General sources

External links 

1949 films
1940s Hindi-language films
Indian musical drama films